William Warren Fenley (February 8, 1922 – January 18, 2009) was an American professional basketball player. He spent one season in the Basketball Association of America (BAA) as a member of the Boston Celtics in the 1946–1947 season. Fenley attended Port Richmond High School on the North Shore of Staten Island and later Manhattan College. After his BAA career ended, he founded the school athletic program for his home parish of St. Rita's Church. Fenley became the first head coach for the Monsignor Farrell High School boys' basketball team in 1964, and the first for Moore Catholic High School in 1968. He was a former United States Marine and New York police sergeant.

BAA career statistics

Regular season

References

External links

1922 births
2009 deaths
American Basketball League (1925–1955) players
American men's basketball players
Boston Celtics players
Forwards (basketball)
High school basketball coaches in New York (state)
Manhattan Jaspers basketball players
New York City Police Department officers
Sportspeople from Staten Island

Basketball players from New York City